The 2018–19 Premier League of Belize was the eighth season of the Premier League of Belize, the highest competitive football league in Belize, after it was founded in 2011. There were two seasons which were spread over two years, the opening was played towards the end of 2018 and the closing was played at the beginning of 2019.

Team information

Opening Season

From the 2017–18 Premier League of Belize closing season, 7 teams continued to play in the opening season of 2018–19, with Altitude taking over the franchise of Placencia Assassins.

There would be one league consisting of the 8 teams, who will play each other twice, with the top 4 teams advancing to the end of season playoffs. The opening season commenced on 22 July 2018.

League table

Results

Playoffs

Semifinals 

Game One

Game Two

Finals 

Game One

Game Two

Season Statistics

Top scorers

 Includes playoff goals.

Hat-tricks

4 Player scored 4 goals

Awards

In the post-game ceremonies of the final game of the season, the individual awards were announced.

Closing Season

All 8 teams that participated in the opening season will participate in the closing season.

The format will be the same as the opening season with one league consisting of the 8 teams, who will play each other twice, with the top 4 teams advancing to the end of season playoffs. The closing season commenced on 12 January 2019.

League table

Results

Playoffs

Semifinals 

Game One

Game Two

Finals 

Game One

Game Two

Season Statistics

Top scorers

 Includes playoff goals.

Hat-tricks

4 Player scored 4 goals

Awards

In the post-game ceremonies of the final game of the season, the individual awards were announced.

Aggregate table

List of foreign players in the league 
This is a list of foreign players in the 2018–19 season. The following players:

 Have played at least one game for the respective club.
 Have not been capped for the Belize national football team on any level, independently from the birthplace.

Each team can have a maximum of five foreign players in their roster.

 (player released during the Opening season)
 (player released between the Opening and Closing seasons)
 (player released during the Closing season)

References

Top level Belizean football league seasons
1
Belize